Cambria Township is a township in Blue Earth County, Minnesota, United States. The population was 271 as of the 2000 census.

History
Cambria Township was organized in 1867. This township was named from Cambria, the Latin name of Wales.

Geography
The Minnesota River flows along the township's northern boundary; its tributary the Little Cottonwood River flows through the northwestern part of the township to its confluence with the Minnesota.

Unincorporated community
 Cambria at

Major highway
  Minnesota State Highway 68

Adjacent townships
 Courtland Township, Nicollet County (north)
 Nicollet Township, Nicollet County (east)
 Judson Township (southeast)
 Butternut Valley Township (south)
 Linden Township, Brown County (southwest)
 Cottonwood Township, Brown County (west)

Cemetery
The township includes Cambria Cemetery.

Demographics
As of the census of 2000, there were 271 people, 107 households, and 80 families residing in the township.  The population density was 13.8 people per square mile (5.3/km). There were 115 housing units at an average density of 5.8/sq mi (2.3/km).  The racial makeup of the township was 98.15% White, 0.74% Asian, 0.37% from other races, and 0.74% from two or more races. Hispanic or Latino of any race were 0.37% of the population.

There were 107 households, out of which 32.7% had children under the age of 18 living with them, 64.5% were married couples living together, 9.3% had a female householder with no husband present, and 25.2% were non-families. 21.5% of all households were made up of individuals, and 7.5% had someone living alone who was 65 years of age or older. The average household size was 2.53 and the average family size was 2.94.

In the township the population was spread out, with 27.3% under the age of 18, 6.6% from 18 to 24, 26.9% from 25 to 44, 28.8% from 45 to 64, and 10.3% who were 65 years of age or older. The median age was 40 years. For every 100 females, there were 99.3 males.  For every 100 females age 18 and over, there were 99.0 males.

The median income for a household in the township was $40,625, and the median income for a family was $50,469. Males had a median income of $35,104 versus $23,750 for females. The per capita income for the township was $21,900.  None of the families and 1.3% of the population were living below the poverty line, including no under eighteens and 11.1% of those over 64.

References
 United States National Atlas
 United States Census Bureau 2007 TIGER/Line Shapefiles
 United States Board on Geographic Names (GNIS)

Townships in Blue Earth County, Minnesota
Mankato – North Mankato metropolitan area
Townships in Minnesota